The FEC Strauss Trunnion Bascule Bridge is a double track railroad bridge spanning the St. Johns River in Jacksonville, Florida.

Completed in 1925 by the Florida East Coast Railway, this structure replaced a single-track swing bridge which opened on January 5, 1890. The current structure is a simple truss bridge with plate girder approaches and a bascule lift allowing ships to pass. It is adjacent to the Acosta Bridge.

References and external links

Photos and information on the bridge 

Bridges completed in 1890
Swing bridges in the United States
Bridges completed in 1925
Bascule bridges in the United States
Bridges in Jacksonville, Florida
Florida East Coast Railway
Railroad bridges in Florida
St. Johns River
Truss bridges in the United States
Bridges over the St. Johns River
1925 establishments in Florida
Plate girder bridges in the United States